Canyon View High School is a public secondary school in Ontario, California. It is one of the eleven schools of the Chaffey Joint Union High School District. Canyon View is one of two continuation schools in the district and enrolls more than 200 students in grades 10 through 12.

History
Canyon View High School was established in 1998 and is physically located on the northwest corner of the Chaffey High School campus. Starting the 2010–2011 school year, due to budget cuts, Canyon View High School has merged with Valley View High School in Ontario.

References

External links
Canyon View High School

High schools in San Bernardino County, California
Public high schools in California
1998 establishments in California